Southern Pacific Railroad's AC-11 class of cab forward steam locomotives was the seventh class of 4-8-8-2 locomotives ordered by Southern Pacific (SP) from Baldwin Locomotive Works; SP was so pleased with the AC-10 class built a year earlier that the railroad began placing orders for AC-11s while the AC-10s were still being built and delivered.  They were built between November 1942 and April 1943, closely resembling the AC-10s.

The first AC-11, number 4245, entered service on November 24, 1942, and the last, 4274, on May 9, 1943.  SP used these locomotives for between 12 and 15 years, with the last retirements from this class occurring on September 24, 1958.  Shortly after their retirement, the AC-11s were scrapped, with the last, number 4274, on April, 1959.

References 
 

AC-11
4-8-8-2 locomotives
Baldwin locomotives
Simple articulated locomotives
Railway locomotives introduced in 1942
Steam locomotives of the United States
Scrapped locomotives
Standard gauge locomotives of the United States
Cab forward steam locomotives 
Freight locomotives